Friar Tut is an album by Americana and Bluegrass dobro player Tut Taylor, released in 1972. Taylor is joined by Norman Blake, Sam Bush and David Taylor. Taylor's son David was 16 years old at the time of this recording.

Friar Tut was reissued on CD in 1998.

Reception 

In his Allmusic review, music critic Tim Sheridan wrote the album "The steel strings sing on this disc of original songs from the dobro guitar master."

Track listing 
All songs by Tut Taylor unless otherwise noted.
"Sweet Picking Time in Toomsboro, Ga" – 1:53
"Ghost Picker" – 2:27
"Acoustic Toothpick" – 2:01
"Linda" – 2:42
"Midnight at Beanblossom" – 3:21
"Daisy Dean" (Traditional) – 2:50
"Sugar in the Gourd" – 1:25
"F-5 Waltz" – 2:16
"Arlo Buck" – 2:16
"Stevens Steel" – 3:17
"Picking on Josh" – 1:16
"Oasis" – 3:43
"This Ain't Grass" – 1:36
"The Old Shoemaker" (Norman Blake) – 2:26
"Me and My Dobro" – 2:44
"Southern Filibuster" – 2:37
"Friar Tut" – 2:00

Personnel
Tut Taylor – dobro, guitar
Norman Blake – guitar, mandolin, vocals on "Daisy Dean"
Sam Bush – mandolin
David Taylor – guitar on "Me and My Dobro" and "Southern Filibuster"
Production notes
Tut Taylor – producer
Michael Melford – executive producer
Claude J. Hill – engineer
Dr. Toby Mountain – mastering
Slick Lawson – photography
Bobby Wolfe – liner notes

References

1972 albums
Tut Taylor albums
Norman Blake (American musician) albums